The American steamer Ozama, 1028 tons, was the former British steamer Craigallion, built by Ramage & Ferguson in 1881 at Leith, Scotland. She had a colorful history, with a mutiny and gunrunning. She was shipwrecked twice, the first time in 1885 in the Bahamas, and the last in 1894 on the outer shoal of Cape Romain, South Carolina. She was named for the Ozama River in Santo Domingo, Dominican Republic, which was one of her regular ports of call.

1884: Towing history
This steamer was definitely a powerful and well built ship as evidenced by the fact that she was selected and used to tow the Nathan Appleton from New York to Central America, the Nathan Appleton was the second of the great dredges to be used in the construction of the Panama Canal.

1885: Wrecked in the Bahamas
The British steamer Craigallion, which was in distress at Watling's Island in April 1885, parted her hawsers, drifted upon the reefs and was wrecked. She was afterwards salvaged and towed from Nassau into Norfolk by the American wrecking steamer Resolute. Cragallion was described as in "fair condition, and is a very successful piece of wrecking work." It was this act of salvage that placed her into American hands.

1886: Mutiny
Ozama's cook and steward were charged with mutiny by their captain, and held for the Grand Jury on June 24, 1886, by United States Commissioner Allen, in Brooklyn.

1888: Gun running
There is no question that Ozama was involved in gunrunning. A contemporary newspaper carried the following account:

1889: Shipping money
An article in The New York Times reported that Ozama carried $300,000 in paper money to Haiti in March 1889. The paper money brought in by the Ozama was not for her own use it was cargo, and said to be the first of $1,000,000 meant to replace a previous issue of paper money. The money was probably being replaced because it had been issued by the prior regime, or because it had been devalued due to inflation and/or counterfeiting. Mercenaries (called Filibusters) who were supporting the overthrow of a government would not have accepted paper money because it could become worthless simply with the change of regime. The same article mentioned that the Legitime government had paid $80,000 in gold for the wood hulled steamship Carondelet, which they hoped to convert to a warship. Gold was then approximately $20 an ounce, so $80,000 in gold would have been approximately 4,000 ounces.

The loss of the Ozama coincided with the discovery of a plot to overthrow Haitian president Hippolyte. The president's son-in-law was implicated and was ordered to be shot but escaped. Attachés of the German legation and prominent officials are also said to be parties to the plot. The outbreak of the revolution, which had been considered imminent for some time, partly due to Hippolyte's poor health, was expected daily so the time was certainly ripe for the smuggling of both guns and money.

1889: Seizure for smuggling
Ozama, which had been openly involved in weapons smuggling on prior trips, was seized by the Haitians who returned her only after the American man-of-war Ossipee, Captain Kellogg, threatened to shell Port-au-Prince. The Ozama's indignant captain claimed she was totally innocent. Her capture and the circumstances of her release resulted in an international incident. Haiti ended up paying $7,500 for the "unlawful" seizure, and the State of Illinois passed a resolution honoring Captain Kellogg.

1894: Wrecked at Cape Romain, South Carolina

On November 23, 1894, the tug W.B. Congdon picked up off the Georgetown Bar Captain Bennington and twelve men of the steamer Ozama, bound from Philadelphia to Charleston in ballast. Captain Bennington reported that the Ozama struck on Cape Romain shoals and stove a hole in the engine room compartment. The water quickly filled the fire rooms, rendering the engines useless. The steamer floated off the shoals soon after striking, and at 3 a.m. sank in six and one half fathoms of water, the Cape Romain light "bearing Northwest by West, half West, six miles distant." The crews took to the boats, saving only part of their clothing. The engineer with ten men went off to board the steamer Planter from Charleston but missed her and it was thought they landed on Romain beach. She was officially traveling in ballast, but because the death of Haiti's president was considered imminent, the timing was certainly right for her again carrying guns and/or a significant quantity of money for either shoring up the existing regime, or for financing an insurrection. Such money would have needed to be in gold, not paper.

2013: Discovery 

The wreck site was discovered in 40 feet of water off Cape Romain by underwater archaeologist Dr. E. Lee Spence in 1979. Spence identified the wreck in June 2013 as the Ozama through the engine type, length, width, type of decking, and other construction details.

According to Spence the wreck is "in surprisingly good condition with most of the ship relatively intact and sitting upright."

References

1881 ships
Ships built in Leith
Maritime incidents in 1894
Shipwrecks in the Atlantic Ocean
Shipwrecks of the Carolina coast
Treasure from shipwrecks